Mike Keim (born November 12, 1965 in Anaheim, California) is a former professional American football player who played tackle for five seasons for the New Orleans Saints and Seattle Seahawks.

References

1965 births
Living people
American football offensive tackles
BYU Cougars football players
New Orleans Saints players
Seattle Seahawks players